Pavithran may refer to:

 V. K. Pavithran, Malayalam film director
 Pavithran (Tamil film director)
 Pavithran (A Computer Programmer)